Roger J. Marzulla (born August 12, 1947) is an American attorney who served as the United States Assistant Attorney General for the Environment and Natural Resources from 1988 to 1989. He is a founding partner at Marzulla Law, LLC in Washington, D.C.  He began his legal career as a trial lawyer in San Jose, California, after graduating magna cum laude from the University of Santa Clara School of Law.

References

1947 births
Living people
United States Assistant Attorneys General for the Environment and Natural Resources Division